City in Darkness, also known as Charlie Chan in City in Darkness is a 1939 American drama film directed by Herbert I. Leeds and starring Sidney Toler, Lynn Bari, and Richard Clark. It is one of the films in the Charlie Chan film series, the fourth starring Toler, and was released on December 1, 1939.

Plot
Charlie Chan (Sidney Toler) is visiting Paris during the Czech annexation crisis in September 1938, but is having trouble finding a way to return to the United States, since there are transportation disruptions due to the threat of the impending war and the Munich Crisis. While visiting the office of the Chief of Police Romaine (C. Henry Gordon), who is away on business, word is received that Petroff (Douglass Dumbrille), a well-known millionaire, has been murdered. Romaine's bumbling godson, Police Inspector Marcel Spivak (Harold Huber) has been left in charge during the chief's absence, and is terrified of handling such a high-profile murder investigation. He asks for Chan's assistance, which is agreed to.

Spivak suspects his butler, Antoine (Pedro de Cordoba), but spy Charlotte Ronnell (Dorothy Tree) is spotted fleeing the residence. Due to a chance encounter earlier, Chan realizes that local woman Marie Dubon (Lynn Bari) is involved, and the two detectives head to her hotel. Charlie learns that Dubon was helping her husband, Tony Madero (Richard Clarke), clear his name after Petroff accused him of smuggling. Following a clue in Dubon's room, Chan interrogates counterfeiter Louis Santelle (Leo G. Carroll). Returning to the Petroff household, Chan and Spivak track down burglars Lola (Barbara Leonard), Max (Louis Mercier), and Alex (George Davis) (who had broken into Petroff's house just before the murder) before interrogating Petroff's business partner, Belescu (Noel Madison).

After nearly being killed by Santelle, Charlie realizes that three clues are the key to the case:  A dropped franc coin, a wooden leg, and a telephone left off the hook. After Belescu is shot, Chan and Spivak chase Ronnell to Le Bourget Airport. But her plane crashes during takeoff and she dies. Chan returns to police headquarters, and reveals that Antoine (a French patriot) killed Petroff after returning home early and discovering that Petroff was selling arms to Nazi Germany. Prefect Romaine says Antoine will likely stand trial for murder, but is likely to receive the Legion of Honour instead of the guillotine.

Cast
Sidney Toler as Charlie Chan
Lynn Bari as Marie Dubon
Richard Clark as Tony Madero
Harold Huber as Marcel
Pedro de Cordoba as Antoine
Dorothy Tree as Charlotte Ronnell
C. Henry Gordon as Prefect of police
Douglass Dumbrille as Petroff
Noel Madison as Belescu
Leo G. Carroll as Louis Santelle
George Davis as Alex
Louis Mercier as Max
Barbara Leonard as Lola
Lon Chaney, Jr. as Pierre

Reception
Harrison's Reports did not give the film a good review. They were critical of the plot, and a script which they found suffered "from an over-abundance of dialogue". They were highly critical of the role of Marcel, as well as Huber's performance.

External links

References

American black-and-white films
1939 drama films
1939 films
Films directed by Herbert I. Leeds
20th Century Fox films
American drama films
Films scored by Samuel Kaylin
1930s American films